Aaron Blabey (born January 1, 1974) is an Australian author of children's books.

He is the creator of three best-selling children's series; Pig the Pug – a picture book series about a rude, selfish, mean-spirited little dog, The Bad Guys – a New York Times #1 bestselling graphic novel series for junior readers about a gang of scary-looking animals trying to change their bad reputations and Thelma the Unicorn – a second picture book series about a plain little pony who pretends to be a unicorn.

As of December 2022, Blabey has around 35 million books in print and his books have spent over 120 weeks on the New York Times Bestseller List. The Bad Guys first reached #1 on the list on July 3 2019.

On April 22, 2022, an animated movie adaptation of The Bad Guys from DreamWorks Animation starring Sam Rockwell, Awkwafina, Marc Maron, Craig Robinson and Anthony Ramos premiered in the United States. Blabey served as an executive producer on the movie with Patrick Hughes and Etan Cohen. The movie opened at #1 at the U.S Box Office and was the second-highest-grossing animated film of 2022.

In May 2019, it was announced that Netflix are developing a movie-musical adaptation of Thelma the Unicorn with Blabey again serving as executive producer.

Until 2005, Blabey was also an actor. In the field of acting, he is probably best known for his lead roles in two television dramedies, 1994's The Damnation of Harvey McHugh, for which he won an Australian Film Institute Award, and 2003's CrashBurn, before retiring from performance in 2005.

Personal life
Aaron Blabey was born on January 1, 1974, in Bendigo, Australia. He married the actress and speech pathologist Kirstie Hutton in April 2000. The couple separated amicably in May 2022. They have two sons. 

Blabey supports The Alannah and Madeline Foundation, who work to protect children from violence.

Career

Acting
Blabey appeared in various television and film roles throughout the 1990s and 2000s and took part in several theatrical productions.

Besides his 1994 award for acting in a lead role, the Australian Film Institute also nominated him in 2000 for his guest-starring role in the series Stingers.

Art
From the mid-2000s, Blabey turned his attention away from acting and towards painting and created six separate solo exhibitions across Australia between 2004 and 2006.

Early picture books
Then in 2006, Blabey turned his focus entirely to the creation of children's picture books. The first of these, Pearl Barley and Charlie Parsley, was published in July 2007.  In 2008, the book received a Children's Book Council of Australia Award in the council's Early Childhood category. The book was also shortlisted for the CBCA's Crichton Award (given to new illustrators), The NSW Premier's Literature Awards – The Patricia Wrightson Award, and the Children's Peace Literature Award.  In 2008, the book was also included on the Notable Book list from the Smithsonian Institution.

His second book, Sunday Chutney, was published in 2008 and shortlisted for the CBCA Picture Book of the Year 2009 and the Australian Book Industry Awards 2009.

His third book, Stanley Paste, was a CBCA Notable Book in the Picture Book category in 2010 as was The Ghost of Miss Annabel Spoon in 2012, which was also selected as a prestigious White Raven of 2012 by the International Youth Library in Munich, Germany. The Ghost of Miss Annabel Spoon also won the Patricia Wrightson Award in 2013 New South Wales Premier's Literary Awards and the 2013 Children's Peace Literature Award. In early 2014, Nick Cave selected The Ghost of Miss Annabel Spoon to record for the Story Box Library website.

His fifth book, The Dreadful Fluff won the Best Designed Children's Cover of the Year by the Australian Publishers Association in 2013, which also saw the release of his critically acclaimed sixth title, Noah Dreary.

This was followed by a picture book for adults entitled Babies Don't Suck – a guide for expectant new fathers.

Blabey's seventh children’s book, The Brothers Quibble, which deals with sibling rivalry, was chosen as the National Simultaneous Storytime Book of 2015, and was read by over 500,000 children on 27 May 2015.

Pig the Pug, Thelma the Unicorn and Piranhas Don't Eat Bananas
In 2014 Blabey signed a three-book deal with Scholastic Australia beginning with Pig the Pug, a humorous picture book about a rude, selfish, mean-spirited dog (pug), who always gets into arguments and even fights with his rival playmate, the friendly, polite-mannered, good-hearted Trevor (dachshund). The book was an immediate hit in Australia and has since been translated into many languages and published around the world. It spawned a series of Pig books including Pig the Fibber (2015), Pig the Winner (2016), Pig the Elf (2016), Pig the Star (2017), Pig the Grub (2018), Pig the Tourist (2019), Pig the Slob (Blob) (2020), Pig the Monster (2021) and the final instalment Pig the Rebel (2022).

The Pig books have sold millions of copies around the world, predominantly in the USA and Australia.

The second book released from his initial three-book-deal was Thelma the Unicorn. This picture book – about a plain little pony who dreams of becoming a unicorn – has also become a bestseller. In combination with its sequel The Return of Thelma the Unicorn, it has sold millions of copies as well.

In June 2019, it was announced that Netflix is developing an animated musical movie adaptation of Thelma the Unicorn, to be directed by Jared Hess (who wrote the script with his wife Jerusha) and Lynn Wang with animation provided by Mikros Image Montreal. Blabey will serve as an executive producer on the project.

The Bad Guys
2015 also saw the release of the first two instalments of Blabey's best-selling graphic novel series for junior readers, The Bad Guys. The humorous series follows the adventures of a gang of scary-looking, dangerous animals – Mr. Wolf, Mr. Snake, Mr. Shark and Mr. Piranha – who attempt to change their bad reputations by performing good deeds.

In January 2018, The Bad Guys hit The New York Times Best Seller list (Children's Series) and have since remained there for many weeks. After 36 weeks on the list, The Bad Guys finally reached the number one spot on July 3 2019.

As of December 2022, there are over 25 million Bad Guys books in print around the world and the series has spent over 120 weeks on the New York Times Bestseller List.

On March 9, 2018, it was announced that an animated feature film adaptation of The Bad Guys was in development at DreamWorks Animation – with a screenplay by Etan Cohen. On October 17, 2019, the project went into production with a scheduled release date September 17, 2021. Due to the COVID 19 pandemic, the release date was pushed back to April 22, 2022. The movie is directed by animator Pierre Perifel in his feature directorial debut and produced by Damon Ross and Rebecca Huntley and written by Etan Cohen and Hillary Winston. Blabey serves as an executive producer on the project with Etan Cohen and Patrick Hughes. It stars Sam Rockwell (Mr. Wolf), Awkwafina (Ms. Tarantula), Marc Maron (Mr. Snake), Craig Robinson (Mr. Shark) and Anthony Ramos (Mr. Piranha).

Whilst promoting the movie in Los Angeles in April 2022, Blabey appeared on Marc Maron’s podcast WTF and discussed his journey to that point with Maron who played Mr Snake in the film.

Cat On The Run 
In January 2022, about 3 months before the release of the film adaptation of The Bad Guys, Blabey announced that a new book called Cat on The Run is in development and slated to be released in 2023. The book takes place in the same universe as The Bad Guys and the story will feature the world’s #1 cat video star trying to prove her innocence after she was framed for a crime she didn’t commit.

Art direction
Blabey has also worked as a staff writer at a major advertising agency and spent two years as a lecturer at a prominent Sydney design college.

Honors and awards
1994, Australian Film Institute Award, Best Actor in a Leading Role in a Television Drama, The Damnation of Harvey McHugh, episode: "Spay Misty For Me."
2008, Children's Book of the Year Award: Early Childhood, Pearl Barley and Charlie Parsley.
2012, White Ravens Award by the International Youth Library, The Ghost of Miss Annabel Spoon.
2012, National Literacy Ambassador
2012 - 2015, Ambassador for The Alannah and Madeline Foundation.
2013, New South Wales Premier's Literary Awards, Patricia Wrightson Prize for Children's Literature, The Ghost of Miss Annabel Spoon.
2013, Best Designed Children's Cover of the Year by the Australian Publishers Association, The Dreadful Fluff.
2013, The Children's Peace Literature Award from the Australian Psychological Society – Psychologists For Peace, The Ghost of Miss Annabel Spoon.
2016, INDIE books award for Best Children's Book, The Bad Guys

List of works
Author and Illustrator
Pearl Barley and Charlie Parsley, Penguin Books, Australia, 2007.
Sunday Chutney, Penguin Books, Australia, 2008.
Stanley Paste, Penguin Books, Australia, 2009.
The Ghost of Miss Annabel Spoon, Penguin Books, Australia, 2011.
The Dreadful Fluff, Penguin Books, Australia, 2012.
Noah Dreary, Penguin Books, Australia, 2013.
The Brothers Quibble, Penguin Books, Australia, 2014.
Pig The Pug, Scholastic Australia, July 2014.
Babies Don't Suck, Pan Macmillan Australia, August 2014.
Thelma the Unicorn, Scholastic Australia, February 2015.
Pig the Fibber, Scholastic Australia, May 2015
The Bad Guys (Episode 1), Scholastic Australia, July 2015
Piranhas Don't Eat Bananas, Scholastic Australia, September 2015.
The Bad Guys (Episode 2 - Mission Unpluckable), Scholastic Australia, November 2015
I Need A Hug, Scholastic Australia, December 2015
Pig the Winner, Scholastic Australia, March 2016
The Bad Guys (Episode 3 - The Furball Strikes Back), Scholastic Australia, May 2016
Don't Call Me Bear, Scholastic Australia, June 2016
Pig the Elf, Scholastic Australia, October 2016
The Bad Guys (Episode 4 - Attack of the Zittens), Scholastic Australia, November 2016
Busting!, Scholastic Australia, February 2017
The Bad Guys (Episode 5 - Intergalactic Gas), Scholastic Australia, May 2017
Guff, Penguin Australia, August 2017
Pig the Star, Scholastic Australia, September 2017
The Bad Guys (Episode 6 - Alien Vs Bad Guys), Scholastic Australia, October 2017
The Bad Guys (Episode 7 - Do-You-Think-He-Saurus?), Scholastic Australia, May 2018
Pig the Grub, Scholastic Australia, September 2018
The Bad Guys (Episode 8 - Superbad), Scholastic Australia, October 2018
The Bad Guys (Episode 9 - The Big Bad Wolf), Scholastic Australia, May 2019
Pig the Tourist, Scholastic Australia, July 2019
The Return of Thelma the Unicorn, Scholastic Australia, October 2019
The Bad Guys (Episode 10 - The Baddest Day Ever), Scholastic Australia, October 2019
The Bad Guys (Episode 11 - Dawn of the Underlord), Scholastic Australia, May 2020
Pig the Slob (Blob), Scholastic Australia, September 2020
The Bad Guys (Episode 12 - The One?!), Scholastic Australia, October 2020
The Bad Guys (Episode 13 - Cut to the Chase), Scholastic Australia, May 2021
Pig the Monster, Scholastic Australia, July 2021
The Bad Guys (Episode 14 - They’re Bee-hind You!), Scholastic Australia, October 2021
The Bad Guys (Episode 15 - Open Wide and Say Arrrgh!), Scholastic Australia, July 2022
Pig the Rebel, Scholastic Australia, July 2022 
The Bad Guys (Episode 16 - The Others?!), Scholastic Australia, October 2022

Filmography

References

External links 
 
 

1974 births
Living people
AACTA Award winners
Australian male actors
Australian artists
Australian children's writers
The Bad Guys